The Jāmeh Mosque of Yazd ( – Masjid-e-Jāmeh Yazd) is the grand, congregational mosque (Jāmeh) of Yazd city, within the Yazd Province of Iran. The mosque is depicted on the obverse of the Iranian 200 rials banknote.

History
The 14th-century mosque is still in use today. It was first built under Ala'oddoleh Garshasb of the Al-e Bouyeh dynasty. The mosque was largely rebuilt between 1324 and 1365, and is one of the outstanding 14th century buildings of Iran.

According to the historians, the mosque was constructed in the site of the Sassanid fire temple and Ala'oddoleh Garshasb commenced building the mosque. The previous mosque was constructed by order of Ala'oddoleh Kalanjar in 6th century A.H., however the main construction of the present building was done by order of "Seyyed Rokn al-Din Mohammad Qazi".

Specifications
The mosque is a fine specimen of Persian architecture. it is a great example of the Azari style of Persian architecture. The entrance to the mosque is crowned by a pair of minarets, the highest in Iran, dating back to the Safavid era and measuring 52 meters in height and 6 meters in diameter. The entrance is decorated from top to bottom in tile work. Within is a long arcaded courtyard where, behind a deep-set south-east iwan, is the sanctuary chamber. This chamber, under a squat tiled dome, is exquisitely decorated with tile mosaic: its tall tiled Mihrab, dated 1365, is one of the finest of its kind in existence. On two star-shaped sgraffito tiles are the name of the craftsman and the date of construction of the Mihrab.
One of the amazing attributes of the Jame Mosque of Yazd is that the lighting system is obtained indirectly by the reflection of light from the white plaster of the dome and the walls. One of the greatest features of the mansion is the square shape of the mosque which makes it look like Kaaba. Kaaba is a holy construction in the Islamic world and is a prominent symbol in Islamic Architecture.

Gallery

See also
 History of Persian domes

References

External links

Photo Gallery
Archnet entry for Jame mosque of Yazd
Square Kufic decoration on the Jameh mosque of Yazd
Yazd Jame Mosque Website 
Yazd Jame Mosque
High-resolution 360° Panoramas of the Jameh Mosque of Yazd | Art Atlas

12th-century mosques
Mosques in Iran
Tourist attractions in Yazd Province
Buildings and structures in Yazd
Mosque buildings with domes
Tiling
National works of Iran
Yazd